Steiermark may refer to:
 Styria, federal state in southeast Austria
 Duchy of Styria in the Holy Roman Empire
 Reichsgau Steiermark, administrative division of Nazi Germany
 Steiermark, merchant vessel, turned into German auxiliary cruiser Kormoran

See also 
 Untersteiermark, the German name for Lower Styria in Slovenia